Scythian is a Celtic rock/Americana band based in the DC Metro Area that formed in 2002. The band's name, according to the members of Scythian, means "[a] bunch of pre-Mesopotamian barbarians who did not use forks or phonics," which they chose to describe a varying sound that encompasses everything from traditional jigs and reels to contemporary covers. The band was named after Ukrainian nomads, Scythians, due to the Ukrainian ancestry of Alexander and Danylo Fedoryka. 

Since its inception, Scythian developed from a group of street performers in Alexandria, VA, to the 2009 winner of Washington City Paper's Best of DC 'Best Local Band' competition. In 2004 the band scored a brief appearance in the M. Night Shyamalan film The Village. The band has toured extensively on the East Coast. The UB Post describes their sound as a mix of Celtic, Klezmer, Gaelic, Gypsy and Rock.

The band currently comprises brothers Alexander Fedoryka (Violin/Mandolin/Harmonica/Bass/Vocals) and Danylo Fedoryka (Rhythm Guitar/Accordion/Vocals), as well as band members Ethan Dean (Bass/Percussion/Vocals) and Johnny Rees (Percussion/Drums/Vocals).

Band members

 Alexander Fedoryka: Vocals, Violin, Mandolin, Harmonica, Bass
 Danylo Fedoryka: Vocals, Rhythm Guitar, Accordion
 Ethan Dean: Vocals, Percussion, Bass
 Johnny Rees: Drums, Percussion, Vocals

Past band members

 Fritz McGirr: Drums, Percussion, Vocals
 Nolan Ladewski: Whistles, Flute, Vocals, Guitar, Banjo, Mandolin, Tenor Banjo
 Larissa Fedoryka: Vocals, Cello, Bass
 Josef Crosby: Vocals, Violin, Bass
 Tim Hepburn: Drums, Percussion, Vocals
 Alexander Kuldell: Drums, Percussion
 Michael Ounallah: Vocals, Percussion, Drums, Banjo
 Danny Schneible: Drums, Percussion, Guitar, Lead Vocals
 Andrew Toy: Drums, Percussion, Vocals
 Ben-David Warner: Banjo, Violin, Viola, Mandolin, Vocals, Guitar

Josef Crosby's departure
Josef Crosby stopped appearing with the band in May 2016, and Larissa Fedoryka took over on bass. On December 13, 2016, Josef Crosby posted an explanation of his departure on his own Facebook band page. He stated that he had taken some time away to address his substance abuse issues, and moving forward he would be continuing his musical career separate from Scythian.

Josef Crosby joined forces with Victor Gagnon, formerly of Seven Nations, to create Pigeon Kings in 2017. Their first show was at Celtic Fling in PA June 2017. Former Scythian drummer Andrew Toy later joined Pigeon Kings.

Discography
Dance at the Crossroads, 2002
Aidan's Orbit, 2004
Immigrant Road Show, 2007
Scythian Live Vol. 1, 2009
Scythian Live Vol. 2, 2010
American Shanty, 2011
It's Not Too Late, 2012
Jump At The Sun, 2014
Old Tin Can, 2015
Roots and Stones, 2020
Quaranstream: The Album, 2021

Appaloosa Music Festival
Appaloosa Music Festival is an annual music festival created by Scythian. The Festival is based at the Skyline Ranch Resort, just a few miles from Front Royal, Virginia. Every year on Labor Day weekend, Appaloosa celebrates the music of the Shenandoah Valley and related genres.

Ultramontane
In 2013, a few members of Scythian formed a new group named 'Ultramontane' in order to perform at the "March for Marriage"  The concert component of the March was ultimately cancelled.

References

External links
Official Scythian Web Page
Pittsburgh City Paper Interview
The Washington Post 'Immigrant Road Show' album review
Andrew Toy Web Page
Josef Crosby's post explaining why he is no longer with Scythian

Celtic fusion groups
Celtic rock groups
American folk rock groups
Musical groups established in 2004
Musical groups from Virginia